Monochamus nigrobasimaculatus is a species of beetle in the family Cerambycidae. It was described by Stephan von Breuning in 1981.

References

nigrobasimaculatus
Beetles described in 1981